The Hong Kong Island East geographical constituency is one of the ten geographical constituencies in the elections for the Legislative Council of Hong Kong which elects two members of the Legislative Council using the single non-transferable vote (SNTV) system. The constituency covers Eastern District and Wan Chai District on Hong Kong Island.

History
The constituency was created under the overhaul of the electoral system imposed by the Beijing government in 2021, replacing Eastern District and Wan Chai District in the Hong Kong Island constituency used from 1998 to 2021. Constituencies with the same name were also created for the 1991 and 1995 elections in the late colonial period, while the 1991 constituency also elected two seats with each voter having two votes with the same boundary.

Returning members

Election results

2020s

References 

Constituencies of Hong Kong
Hong Kong Island
Constituencies of Hong Kong Legislative Council
2021 establishments in Hong Kong
Constituencies established in 2021